Khairang is a village development committee in Makwanpur District in the Narayani Zone of southern Nepal. At the time of the 1991 Nepal census it had a population of 2535 people living in 466 individual households.

The recent population of khairang VDC is 3633 as per a survey carried out by Nepal red cross society  in 2015 AD .

References

Populated places in Makwanpur District